Khomiran or Khomeyran or Khamiran may refer to:
 Khomiran, Bandar-e Anzali, Gilan Province
 Khomeyran, Shaft, Gilan Province
 Khamiran, Isfahan